William Edmond (Federalist) was elected to represent one of the four seats in  in late 1797.  He replaced James Davenport (Federalist) who had died August 3, 1797.

External links 
 https://elections.lib.tufts.edu/catalog/tufts:ct.special.congress.1797, complete results

See also 
 United States House of Representatives elections, 1796#Connecticut

1797
Connecticut
United States House of Representatives
United States House of Representatives 1797 At-large
Connecticut 1797 At-large
Connecticut